was an art movement in early 20th-century Japan, during the Taishō and Shōwa periods, that revitalized the traditional ukiyo-e art rooted in the Edo and Meiji periods (17th–19th century). It maintained the traditional ukiyo-e collaborative system (hanmoto system) where the artist, carver, printer, and publisher engaged in division of labor, as opposed to the parallel sōsaku-hanga (creative prints) movement which advocated the principles of "self-drawn" (jiga), "self-carved" (jikoku) and "self-printed" (jizuri), according to which the artist, with the desire of expressing the self, is the sole creator of art.

The movement was initiated and nurtured by publisher Watanabe Shozaburo (1885–1962), and flourished from around 1915 to 1942, resuming on a smaller scale after the Second World War through the 1950s and 1960s. Inspired by European Impressionism (which itself had drawn from ukiyo-e), the artists incorporated Western elements such as the effects of light and the expression of individual moods, but focused on strictly traditional themes of landscapes (fukeiga), famous places (meishō), beautiful women (bijinga), kabuki actors (yakusha-e), and birds-and-flowers (kachō-e).

History
Shin-hanga prints were directed to a Western audience largely through Western patronage and art dealers such as Robert O. Muller (1911-2003). Primarily aimed at foreign markets, shin-hanga prints appealed to Western taste for nostalgic and romanticized views of Japan and as such, enjoyed immense popularity overseas. In the 1920s, there were articles on shin-hanga in the International Studio, The Studio, The Art News and The Art Digest magazines. In 1921, a Shinsaku-hanga Tenrankai ("New Creative Print Exhibition") was held in Tokyo. One hundred and fifty works by ten artists were exhibited. In 1930 and 1936, two major shin-hanga exhibitions were held at the Toledo Museum of Art in Ohio. They were the largest showcases of shin-hanga prints at the time.

There was not much domestic market for shin-hanga prints in Japan. Ukiyo-e prints were considered by the Japanese as mass commercial products, as opposed to the European view of ukiyo-e as fine art during the climax of Japonisme. After decades of modernization and Westernization during the Meiji era, architecture, art and clothing in Japan came to follow Western modes. Japanese art students were trained in the Western tradition. Western oil paintings (yōga) were considered high art and received official recognition from the Bunten (The Ministry of Education Fine Arts Exhibition). Shin-hanga prints, on the other hand, were considered as a variation of the outdated ukiyo-e. They were dismissed by the Bunten and were subordinated under oil paintings and sculptures.

Shin-hanga declined as the military government tightened its control over the arts and culture during wartime. In 1939, the Army Art Association was established under the patronage of the Army Information Section to promote war art. By 1943, an official commission for war painting was set up and artists’ materials were rationed. Overseas market for Japanese prints declined drastically at the same time.

Demand for shin-hanga never regained its momentum postwar. Nevertheless a small number of artists continued in the tradition. In the last decades of the 20th century publishers instead concentrated on making reproductions of early 20th century shin-hanga; meanwhile sōsaku-hanga enjoyed immense popularity and prestige in the international art scene. The early 21st century has seen somewhat of a resurgence in shin-hanga popularity notably in market demand for earlier masters such as Kawase Hasui (1883–1957) and Hiroshi Yoshida (1876–1950), and for new artists continuing the shin-hanga aesthetic such as Paul Binnie (1967–). Steve Jobs, the head of Apple, was among the prominent collectors of shin-hanga.

Notable artists
Hashiguchi Goyō

Itō Shinsui
Kaburagi Kiyokata
Kawase Hasui
Elizabeth Keith
Kitano Tsunetomi
Kobayakawa Kiyoshi
Kojima Gyokuhō
Natori Shunsen
Ohara Koson
Koichi Okada
Ota Masamitsu (also known as Ota Gako)
Settai Komura

Shiro Kasamatsu
Takahashi Shōtei (also known as Hiroaki)
Takeji Asano
Torii Kotondo
Tsuchiya Koitsu
Tsuchiya Rakusan
Yamakawa Shūhō
Yamamura Toyonari
Yoshida Hiroshi

References

Further reading
Blair, Dorothy. Modern Japanese prints: printed from a photographic reproduction of two exhibition catalogues of modern Japanese prints published by the Toledo Museum of Art in 1930-1936. Ohio: Toledo Museum of Art, 1997.
Brown, K. and Goodall-Cristante, H. Shin-Hanga: New Prints in Modern Japan. Los Angeles County Museum of Art, 1996.  
Hamanoka, Shinji. Female Image: 20th Century Prints of Japanese Beauties. Hotei Publishing 2000.  
Jenkins, D. Images of a Changing World: Japanese Prints of the Twentieth Century. Portland: Portland Art Museum, 1983.  
Menzies, Jackie. Modern boy, Modern Girl: Modernity in Japanese Art 1910-1935. Sydney, Australia: Art Gallery NSW, c1998.   
 Merritt, Helen and Nanako Yamada.  (1995). Guide to Modern Japanese Woodblock Prints, 1900-1975. Honolulu: University of Hawaii Press.	; ;  OCLC 247995392
Merritt, Helen. Modern Japanese Woodblock Prints: The Early Years. Honolulu: University of Hawaii Press 1990.  
Mirviss, Joan B. Printed to Perfection: Twentieth-century Japanese Prints from the Robert O. Muller Collection. Washington D.C.: Arthur M. Sackler Gallery, Smithsonian Institution and Hotei Publishing 2004.  
 Newland, Amy Reigle. (2005). Hotei Encyclopedia of Japanese Woodblock Prints.  Amsterdam: Hotei. ;  OCLC 61666175 
Smith, Lawrence. Modern Japanese Prints 1912-1989. New York, London, Paris: Cross River Press, 1994. 
Swinton, Elizabeth de Sabato. Terrific Tokyo: A panorama in Prints from the 1860s to the 1930s. Worcester: Worcester Art Museum, 1998. 
Masuda, Koh. Kenkyusha's New Japanese-English Dictionary, Kenkyusha Limited, Tokyo 1991,

External links

Video showing the printing of a shin-hanga work by craftsman David Bull (16 mins)
"The Shin Hanga Movement in America" Video lecture by Dr. Kendall Brown on roles played by artist Hiroshi Yoshida and museum professional J. Arthur MacLean in disseminating the art (50 mins)
Shin hanga — Viewing Japanese Prints website by John Fiorillo
Dream Worlds: Modern Japanese Prints and Paintings from the Robert O. Muller Collection Online Exhibition
Robert O. Muller Information about the man behind one of the most well known collections of Shin Hanga.

20th century in art
20th century in Japan
Ukiyo-e genres
Schools of Japanese art
Impressionism